Leccinum angustisporum is a species of bolete fungus in the family Boletaceae. Found in the United States, it was described as new to science in 1967 by mycologists Alexander H. Smith, Harry Delbert Thiers, and Roy Watling.

References

Fungi described in 1967
Fungi of the United States
angustisporum
Fungi without expected TNC conservation status